Crudia scortechinii is a species of plant in the family Fabaceae. It is a tree endemic to Peninsular Malaysia. The wood of trees of this genus in called "Babi Kurus" (thin pig) in local language. This plant is threatened by habitat loss due to harvesting of the trees.

References

scortechinii
Endemic flora of Peninsular Malaysia
Trees of Peninsular Malaysia
Vulnerable plants
Taxonomy articles created by Polbot